Mickey's Once Upon a Christmas is a 1999 American animated Christmas anthology comedy fantasy film produced by Walt Disney Television Animation.

The film includes three features: Donald Duck: Stuck on Christmas (featuring Donald Duck, Daisy Duck, Scrooge McDuck and Huey, Dewey, and Louie), A Very Goofy Christmas (featuring Goofy, Max, Pete and the Beagle Boys) and Mickey and Minnie's Gift of the Magi (featuring Mickey Mouse, Minnie Mouse and Pluto). Other Disney characters also make cameos in the film.

The film won the Award for Best Animated Feature Film at the 5th Kecskemét Animation Film Festival in 1999. A sequel, titled Mickey's Twice Upon a Christmas, was released in 2004. Unlike Once Upon a Christmas, the sequel is a computer-generated film rather than a hand-drawn and has five segments.

Stories

Donald Duck: Stuck On Christmas
Inspired by the 1892 short story "Christmas Every Day" by William Dean Howells. Huey, Dewey and Louie wake up one Christmas morning and then go downstairs to open their presents, even though they are supposed to wait for Daisy, Uncle Scrooge and Aunt Gertie to arrive. The boys then take their new sleds from Uncle Donald (not reading the included card) and go sledding before having Christmas dinner, where Donald yells at them to learn some manners. While Donald, Daisy, Uncle Scrooge and Aunt Gertie sing carols, the boys play with their new toys.

Later, it is time to go to bed and having enjoyed the day immensely, the boys wish for it to be Christmas every day. Their wish is granted and at first they are joyful. After a few days however, they begin to get tired of Christmas and realize that every day will be exactly the same. They decide to change the course of action of the next day by playing tricks and pranks, including swapping the cooked turkey with a live one at dinner. It turns out to be a terrible Christmas for everyone, especially Donald.

Shortly after, the boys read the card that was given to them earlier by Donald and Daisy. The card wishes them love and explains that Christmas is not just about presents, it is also about being with family. The boys feel guilty and decide to make amends by making the next day the best Christmas ever. As the boys spread love and cheer by giving Aunt Gertie kisses and helping Daisy with dinner, Donald becomes suspicious. Whilst singing carols, Donald confronts the boys, demanding to know what they are up to. An outraged Daisy snaps at Donald, accusing him of spoiling a perfect Christmas. Huey, however, admits that Donald was right and that he and his brothers forgot something. Huey, Dewey and Louie pull out their gift for Uncle Donald - a sail boat made out of their sleds. Genuinely surprised, embarrassed & touched, Donald thanks his nephews with a warm hug. At the end of the next day, the boys finally realize the true meaning of Christmas and the time loop ends, leading into the day after Christmas.

A Very Goofy Christmas
Goofy and Max are mailing a letter to Santa Claus. However, as soon as they get home, their neighbor Pete tells Max that Santa does not exist, saying it is impossible for him to fly around the world in one night. Things get worse when Goofy poses as Santa for some kids and Max finds out that he tricked him. Goofy is determined to prove to Max that Santa does exist and stays up all Christmas Eve to keep an eye out for him while Max, still bitter, just wants to move on. After mistaking a Beagle Boy (who was robbing Pete's house) for Santa, Goofy eventually gives up hope of Santa coming. Max then does everything that Goofy did, to try and make him happy, including posing as (a very small) Santa himself. In the end, the real Santa actually comes and gives Max the gift he had asked for earlier (as well as burying Pete's house next door in snow as punishment). When Max asks Goofy if Santa forgot his present, Goofy answers that every year he asks for the same thing and he always gets it - Max's happiness.

This segment of Mickey's Once Upon a Christmas chronologically precedes the cartoon series, Goof Troop and its film A Goofy Movie. Max is voiced by Shaun Fleming.

Mickey and Minnie's Gift of the Magi
Based on the 1905 short story "The Gift of the Magi" by O. Henry. Mickey wants to get Minnie a gold chain for her one heirloom, her watch, so he works at Crazy Pete's Tree Lot. Minnie wants to give Mickey something special for Christmas as well, so she works hard at her job in a department store to get a bonus to buy a present with. When Mickey offers a small tree to a poor family who cannot afford to buy a special 10-footer tree, his greedy supervisor Pete steals Mickey's money and dismisses him. Pete inadvertently puts his lit cigar into his pocket with Mickey's money without noticing, which triggers a sequence that ends up setting himself, the money and his trees – including the 10-footers – on fire, much to Pete's dismay. Meanwhile, Minnie's bonus from her stingy boss Mortimer Mouse proves to be nothing but a fruit cake. After playing music for a toy drive with the Firehouse Five, Mickey has the idea that he can trade his harmonica for the gold chain. The shop is closing when he gets there and the owner who is just leaving isn't interested in the harmonica, but changes his mind after hearing Mickey play it. Back at Minnie's house, Mickey gives her the chain for her watch, which she no longer has and Minnie gives him a case for his harmonica, which he also no longer has. However, Mickey and Minnie get emotional seeing how far they went to profess their love and they are still able to celebrate a happy Christmas. As in The Gift of the Magi original story, the thought behind each gift is what counts.

Finale
The film concludes with a medley of various songs, "Jingle Bells", "Deck the Halls" and "We Wish You a Merry Christmas", featuring the main characters from the three segments.

Cast
 Wayne Allwine as Mickey Mouse
 Russi Taylor as Minnie Mouse, Huey Duck, Dewey Duck and Louie Duck
 Tony Anselmo as Donald Duck
 Diane Michelle as Daisy Duck (The Gift of the Magi only)
 Tress MacNeille as Daisy Duck (Stuck on Christmas, singing voice in the finale), Chip and Aunt Gertie
 Alan Young as Scrooge McDuck
 Bill Farmer as Goofy, Pluto
 Corey Burton as Dale
 Shaun Fleming as Max Goof
 Jim Cummings as Pete, Police, Mailman, Fire Chief, Dad, onlooker, shop owner, and Santa Claus
 Jeff Bennett as Dad Firefighter #2, Mortimer Mouse, Store Announcer, Man and Costumer
 Gregg Berger as Mr Anderson, and Shopper
 Kylie Dempsey as Kid #2, and Little Girl
 Taylor Dempsey as Little Jimmy, and Kid #1
 Andrew McDonaugh as Boy
 Pat Musick as Distressed Woman, Angry Woman, Eccentric Lady, Shopper and Mrs Anderson
 Frank Welker as Turkey and Figaro
 Mae Whitman as Girl
 April Winchell as Mom, Old Woman, Firewoman, and Firefighter #1
 Kelsey Grammer as the Narrator
 Tommy Morgan provides Mickey's harmonica solos
 Randy Crenshaw/Rick Logan/Bobbi Page/Norman Large as Christmas Carols Medley

Home media
The film was originally released on VHS and DVD on November 9, 1999. It was later re-released on VHS and on DVD (as part of the Walt Disney Gold Classic Collection) on November 7, 2000. Coinciding with its 15th anniversary, the film was released in a 2-Movie Collection Blu-ray and DVD with Mickey's Twice Upon a Christmas on November 4, 2014.

Reception
The film holds  rating on Rotten Tomatoes based on 5 reviews, with an average rating of 3.7/5. Common Sense Media rated the movie a 3/5.

See also
 List of Christmas films

References

External links

 
 

1999 films
1999 animated films
1999 direct-to-video films
1990s American animated films
1990s Christmas films
Adaptations of works by O. Henry
American anthology films
American children's animated comedy films
American Christmas comedy films
DisneyToon Studios animated films
Disney direct-to-video animated films
Donald Duck films
Films based on American short stories
Films directed by Bradley Raymond
Goofy (Disney) films
Mickey Mouse films
Santa Claus in film
Time loop films
Animated Christmas films
1990s Christmas comedy films
Disney Television Animation films
1999 comedy films
1990s children's animated films
Scrooge McDuck
Films directed by Jun Falkenstein
Films produced by Jim Ballantine
1990s English-language films